The Royal Academy is the official school for music, dance, and theater in China between the Tang Dynasty and Ming Dynasty, lasting more than 1000 years.

History
In the 7th Century, the Chinese Royal Academy was set up by Emperor Gaozu of Tang in the purpose to teach music, theater, and dance for court entertainment. The name of the Royal Academy at first was Private Academy (Chinese: 內教坊), coordinated by the Tai-Chang Temple (Chinese: 太常寺, the central religion administration for the royal family). In the years of Empress Wu Zetian, the Private Academy was once called Yun-Shao Palace (Chinese: 雲韶府, which means the place of cloud and sunlight). Finally, Emperor Zhongzong of Tang renamed the academy to the Royal Academy. In the meantime, he made the school independent with a new governmental official similar to the western Kapellmeister to guide.

References

Music organizations based in China